Brian McMahon may refer to:

 Brian McMahon (rowing) (born 1961), Canadian coxswain
 Brian McMahon (hurler), former Irish hurler
 Brian McMahon (footballer) (born 1939), former Australian rules footballer
 Brian McMahon (New Zealand Army officer) (born ), New Zealand Army doctor
 Brian "Barney" McMahon (1928–2010), Irish Air Corps commander 1984–1989

See also
 Brien McMahon (1903–1952), American lawyer and politician
Bryan McMahon, see Rossington Main Novices' Hurdle 
Brian MacMahon (disambiguation)